Bochum-Werne is a district of the city of Bochum in the Ruhr area in North Rhine-Westphalia in Germany. Werne is in the East of Bochum, North of Langendreer.
Werne borders to the city of Dortmund.

Werne